The Riverbones: Stumbling After Eden in the Jungles of Suriname is a non-fiction book, written by Canadian writer Andrew Westoll, first published in October 2008 by McClelland & Stewart. In the book, the author chronicles civil strife in Suriname. Westoll describes the modern struggles for human rights, ecological preservation, and the economic needs of the Suriname people. The Riverbones is called "a spellbinding tale of survival, heartbreak, mystery and murder".

Awards and honours
The Riverbones received shortlist recognition for the 2009 "Edna Staebler Award for Creative Non-Fiction".

See also
List of Edna Staebler Award recipients

References

External links
Westoll, Andrew, The Riverbones, Excerpt, Retrieved 11/23/2012

Canadian non-fiction books
2008 non-fiction books
McClelland & Stewart books